Shayne Elian Jay Pattynama (born 11 August 1998) is a Dutch-Indonesian professional footballer who plays for Eliteserien club Viking. Although primarily a left-back, he can also play as a central midfielder.

Club career

Jong Utrecht
He made his Eerste Divisie debut for Jong Utrecht on 21 August 2017 in a game against TOP Oss. He scored his first and only goal for Jong Utrecht on 11 February 2019, in a 2–4 home loss to Go Ahead Eagles.

SC Telstar
After two seasons, he moved to league rivals Telstar, in 2019. Pattynama made his debut on 18 October 2019 in a match against Almere City. On 18 January 2020, He scored his first goal for Telstar in a 3–3 draw over Excelsior Rotterdam at the Van Donge & De Roo Stadion, Rotterdam.

Viking FK
Pattynama signed with Norwegian Eliteserien club Viking on 16 March 2021. He was set to join the team on 1 April. He scored his first goal for the club on 13 June 2021 against Vålerenga in a 4–1 win. A few months later, on 26 September, he scored his second goal agianst Molde in a 2–2 draw.

International career

In March 2023, Pattynama received a called up by Indonesia coach Shin Tae-Yong for two friendly matches against Burundi on the 25th and 28th.

Personal life
Pattynama has Indonesian ancestry through his father of Moluccan ethnicity from Haruku Island, Central Maluku that was born at Semarang, Central Java.

On 24 January 2023, Pattynama officially acquired Indonesian citizenship.

Career statistics

References

External links

1998 births
Living people
Indo people
Dutch footballers
Dutch people of Indonesian descent
Indonesian expatriate footballers
Expatriate footballers in Norway
Dutch expatriate sportspeople in Norway
Jong FC Utrecht players
SC Telstar players
Viking FK players
Eerste Divisie players
Eliteserien players
Association football defenders
Footballers from Lelystad
Dutch people of Moluccan descent
Naturalised citizens of Indonesia